"Caruso" is a song written by Italian singer-songwriter Lucio Dalla in 1986. It is dedicated to Enrico Caruso, an Italian tenor. Following Lucio Dalla's death, the song entered the Italian Singles Chart, peaking at number two for two consecutive weeks. The single was also certified platinum by the Federation of the Italian Music Industry.

Meaning of the song
The song simply tells about the pain and longings of a man who is about to die while he is looking into the eyes of a girl who was very dear to him. The lyrics contain various subtle references to people and places in Caruso's life.

Lucio Dalla told the origin and the meaning of the song in an interview to one of the main Italian newspapers, the Corriere della Sera. He stopped by the coastal town of Sorrento and stayed in the Excelsior Vittoria Hotel, coincidentally in the very same room where many years earlier the tenor Enrico Caruso spent some time shortly before dying. Dalla was inspired to write the song after the owners told him about the last days of Caruso and in particular the latter's passion for one of his young female students.

Caruso was an acclaimed Italian operatic singer who was one of the greatest and most sought-after singers during the late 19th and early 20th centuries. Unfortunately he lived a very difficult and rather unhappy life, having had many challenges and problems with Italian opera houses, but gained more fame and success in the United States.

Caruso was born to a poor family in Naples. He was often involved with women, and had several love affairs with prominent married women in the performing arts, which often ended badly. His longest and most passionate love affair was with the married Ada Giachetti, with whom he had two sons. It ended when she left him for their chauffeur. A few years before he died, he met and wed a woman 20 years his junior, Dorothy Park Benjamin, whom Lucio Dalla describes in this song "Caruso". With her he had a daughter named Gloria.

Sorrento is referred to as "Surriento", which is the name in the Neapolitan language. It refers to Caruso's frequent visits to the seaside town and its Excelsior Vittoria Hotel.

Here the "chain" is a translation, but what is meant is a chain reaction – such love melts the blood and so forth. The music and words of the above refrain, written in a mixture of standard Italian and Neapolitan, are based on a Neapolitan song, titled "Dicitencello vuje", published in 1930 by Rodolfo Falvo (music) and Enzo Fusco (text) written according to the best tradition of Neapolitan "romances" with a style reminiscent of opera.

Because of this there are some interesting linguistic differences. The cognate phrase, "ti voglio bene", literally meaning "I wish you well", is generally not used in a romantic context in standard Italian. However, in Neapolitan, "Te voglio bene assaje, ma tantu tanto bene saje" means, "I love you very much. Very, very much, you know." In standard Italian, "Ti amo" is reserved for romantic love, but "te amo" in Neapolitan bears the opposite connotation.

From a psychological point of view, words with a non-romantic coloring, "Ti voglio bene" mean the transference of feelings, attitudes, or desires a person has about one thing are subconsciously projected onto the here-and-now Other. In this context - on Caruso's mother.

Lucio Dalla's official video of the song was filmed in the 'Caruso Suite' at the Excelsior Vittoria Hotel where Caruso spent most of the final weeks of his life, though Caruso died at the Vesuvio Hotel in Naples.

In 2015, on the occasion of the third anniversary of Dalla's passing, GoldenGate Edizioni published the biographical novel by Raffaele Lauro, "Caruso The Song – Lucio Dalla and Sorrento", which through unpublished testimonies reconstructs the almost fifty-year-long bond (from 1964 to 2012) of the great artist with Sorrento ("Sorrento is the true corner of my soul"), and the authentic inspiration for his masterpiece, "Caruso". The documentary film by the same author, "Lucio Dalla and Sorrento – Places of the Soul", was presented in the national première on 7 August 2015 at the Social World Film Festival 2015 in Vico Equense.

Cover versions

 Russian singer Vitas covered this song in 2002 (later released as a digital download on the Vitas' official site – as well as the Radio Vitas Online – in 2011).
Florent Pagny covered the song in 1996. Released as a single, his version peaked at No. 2 in France and No. 3 in Belgium (Wallonia).
Trumpeter Chris Botti covered the song from 2007 album Italia.

Charts

Weekly charts

Year-end charts

References

External links
UK Soul Singer Steve Menzies soulful version of Caruso.
Caruso Lyrics in Italian and English (Andrea Bocelli's interpretation)

Lucio Dalla songs
1986 songs
Italian patriotic songs
Songs about musicians
Cultural depictions of Enrico Caruso
Songs written by Lucio Dalla
Neapolitan songs